Obchodní centrum Letňany, also known as OC Letňany is a shopping mall located in the Letňany district of Prague, Czech Republic. The complex was described by The Prague Post in 2001 as "one of the best malls in the city". According to OC Letňany's marketing manager, over 10 million customers visited the shopping centre in 2008.

History

Tenants
One of the principal stores at OC Letňany is Tesco, which opened on the site in 1999. The store was remodelled in 2014, with its floor space decreasing from 11,000 to 8,000 square metres, owing to a new division between clothing and other products.

A Cinema City multiplex cinema, a babysitting service, and two indoor ice rinks, open throughout the year, are also located within the mall. Letnany's food court features a wide variety of international options including Thai, Japanese, Middle Eastern, Chinese, Indian, French and Czech cuisine. In 2011, plans were announced for a McDonald's as well as a car dealership to be added to the mall's facilities.

Transport
The centre is served by a free bus service from the Letňany metro station on Prague Metro's Line C. Prior to the line C extension in 2008, the centre was served with regular buses from the Nádraží Holešovice metro station. Bus stop Tupolevova is also located in close proximity to the mall, with local bus services.

See also
List of shopping malls in the Czech Republic

References

External links

Official website

Shopping malls in Prague
1997 establishments in the Czech Republic
Shopping malls established in 1997
Economy of Prague
Buildings and structures in Prague
20th-century architecture in the Czech Republic